Alto das Cruzes cemetery is a cemetery in Miramar, Luanda, Angola. It is one of the most prominent cemeteries of the city, where many of the illustrious Angolan personalities are buried. In 1996 the cemetery was photographed extensively by the Escola Profissional da Lousã.

References

Buildings and structures in Luanda
Cemeteries in Angola